Biagio Miniera (1697 - August 28, 1755) was an Italian painter, active in a Rococo style.

Biography
Miniera was born in Ascoli Piceno. He first trained locally under Carlo Palucci, then traveled to Rome to study under Pietro Subleyras and in the French Academy in Rome. He was influenced by Giulio Solimena, brother of the more famous Francesco. He is said to have painted colorful capricci in tempera. Returning to Ascoli, he painted the sipario for the new theater in the Palazzo Anzianale. He opened a studio-school with various apprentices. He was buried in Ascoli in the Church of Santa Maria delle Grazie.

Niccola Monti was one of his pupils.

References

1697 births
1755 deaths
People from the Province of Ascoli Piceno
18th-century Italian painters
Italian male painters
Italian Baroque painters
18th-century Italian male artists